Det kære legetøj (The Dear Toy, also known as Danish Blue), made in 1968 by director Gabriel Axel, is a Danish feature film advocating the legalizing of pornography.

A campaigning film, it mixes interviews, reconstructions and fiction in playful fashion, seeking to ridicule and undermine Denmark's censorship laws at the time. The film may be said to have been successful in its objective, as a year after its release Denmark completely legalized pornography.

The film was banned in France but released in both England and the United States. It started a whole wave of documentary films about pornography in Denmark.

Cast
Birgit Brüel
Henrik Wiehe
Aage Fønss

Hardy Rafn
Per Pallesen
Poul Glargaard
Jesper Klein

References

Further reading
Ebbe Villadsen: Danish Erotic Film Classics (2005)

External links

Det kære legetøj at the Danish National Filmography

1968 films
1968 documentary films
Danish documentary films
1960s Danish-language films
Documentary films about pornography
Films directed by Gabriel Axel